Prataparudra Deva (Odia: ଗଜପତି ପ୍ରତାପରୁଦ୍ର ଦେବ) was the third Gajapati emperor of Odisha from the Suryavamsa Gajapati Empire  started by his grandfather Kapilendra Deva Routaraya. He ruled from the year 1497 to 1540 A.D. Besides being a ruler, he was a devout Vaishnava and adherent of the famous saint, Sri Chaitanaya who arrived in Odisha during his rule. His life was extremely occupied with overwhelming military campaigns in defense of his inherited territory from three frontal invasions by the enemy states Vijayanagar, Hussain Shahi dynasty of Bengal and Qutb Shahi dynasty of Golconda. He lost large portions of his territory to the neighboring enemy states initiating the dissolution of Odisha's military hegemony and imperial status that continued for nearly a period of 600 years before him.

Military Conflicts on All Fronts and Decline of Imperial Odisha 
Prataparudra Deva's life was heavily occupied in dealing with continuous military threats by his neighboring rulers on multiple fronts.

First War with Hussain Shahi Dynasty of Bengal (1497-1500 A.D) 
On the death of Purushottam Deva, Prataparudra Deva was immediately engulfed with the defensive measures for his empire from the consistently invading parties of Gauda or Bengal sultan Alauddin Hussain Shah. The Bhakti Bhagavata Maha Kavyam states that he was only 17 years old when he faced this challenge and finally drove the invaders out of his northern borders. He reinforced the northern frontiers with more military deployment though minor skirmishes continued.

Southern Expedition and brief occupation of Vijayanagar (1500-1508 A.D) 
After being able to halt the invasions from Bengal, Prataparudra Deva marches south to recover and capture territories from Vijayanagar Kingdom. For a brief time he was able to capture Vijayanagara or Vidyanagar fort.  Anantavarman copper plates of Prataparudra Deva states that he reached the banks of river Krishna on 4 November 1500 AD.

First conflict with Vijayanagar 
The Saluva dynasty ruler Immadi Narasimha Raya was ruling Vijayanagar when Prataparudra Deva sets out for his southern expedition. His influential commander Tuluva Narasa Nayaka tried to recover Kondavidu and Udayagiri forts from the Prataparudra Deva in a military contest with the Gajapati. Prataparudra Deva's Anantakarma grant declares that he was able to capture the Krishna river basin with the use of force. The Odia army was unable to make any advance into Vijayanagara territory beyond their stronghold of Udayagiri region. The Odia army though managed to march to the tip of the Sethu Bandha or Adam's bridge in the south.

Second conflict with Vijayanagar 
According to the Rajavrolu plates of Prataparudra Deva and Madala Panji records, the Gajapati was camping on the river Ponnaiyar river banks and was successful in occupying parts of Vijayanagar for a brief time from Viranarasimha Raya after driving out the inmates of the fortified city there. However, the king had to suddenly return to Odisha as a severe famine ensued in his own kingdom in the year 1507-1508 A.D.

Second War with Hussain Shahi Dynasty of Bengal (1509 A.D) 
The Sultan of Bengal Alauddin Hussain Shah sent his commander Ismail Ghazi with an invasion force to attack Odisha when the Gajapati was and most of his army was on the expedition of southern India.  The Upada grant and Velicherla plates of Prataparudra Deva state the invasive intentions of the Bengal sultan displayed continuously by trying to violate the frontier positions.

Ismail Ghazi's Invasion in Absence of the King 
Ismail Ghazi marched straight on to the Gajapati capital of Cuttack from the Bengal frontier. A formidable defense was put up by the defending in charge Ananta Samantaray of the Barabati fort in Cuttack but due to the overwhelming number of the raiding  forces, he had to retreat and re position in the Sarangagarh fort on the southern side of the Kathajodi river. Ismail marched on to the holy city of Puri where the servitors and priests of Puri temple secretly transported the Jagannath idols via a boat to a hidden island hill amidst the Chilika lake called Chadeiguha before his arrival. An Odia governor called Bhoi Bidyadhar organized the defense and continued clashing with the raiders until the Gajapati army returned. After arriving back in his kingdom with a large expeditionary force amidst these chaotic conditions, Prataparudra Deva pursued the fleeing  forces into the frontier of Bengal laying seize to the Mandarana fort of Qutb Shahi forces at today's Jahanabad Sub-Division in Hoogly.

First Battle of Mandarana Fort 
Mandrana fort of Bengal was a militarily strategic fort of the Sultans of Bengal where Alauddin Hussain Shah was himself located at the time when Prataparudra Deva laid a seize. After a severe fighting, the fort fell into the hands of the Odia army and the Sultan of Bengal along with some of his followers fled from the location leaving their army in the middle of the battle who were also later put to a crushing defeat.

Treachery of Govinda Vidyadhar and Second Battle of Mandarana Fort 
After the conquest of the fort Govinda Vidyadhara, a traitor who happened to be a high ranking commander of the Odia ranks changed sides in his greed for the throne of Odisha and joined the Sultan of Bengal. Though the fighting had stopped for a while, it resumed when the Alauddin got support from Govinda Vidyadhara. A severe conflict ensued in the same site and possibly the Mandarana fort fell back into the hands of the Hussain Shahi forces. The Odia army didn't retreat instead continued to hold up the Muslim armies on the northern frontiers reinforced by the orders of the Gajapati.

Seven Years War with Vijayanagar and downfall of the Empire (1512-1519 A.D) 
Krishnadevaraya became the king of Vijayanagar in the year 1509. Sensing the threat posed by the Gajapati forces in the south, he was advised by his minister Timmarusu to undertake a military campaign for occupying the forts like Udayagiri, Kondapalii and Kondavidu under the control of Odia forces. Also, the timing was apt as Prataparudra Deva was himself absent in the Deccan and was indulged in conflicts with the Muslim forces of Bengal. Krishnadevaraya first subdued the Velama chiefs of the Telegana region who were the allies of Gajapati king from the times of Kapilendra Deva Routaraya. He then marched on to the Udaygiri fort.

Seizure of Udayagiri Fort and resistance by Odia forces (1512-1514 A.D) 

Udayagiri fort was guarded by an Odia garrison of 10,000 infantry, 400 cavalry and 8000 other men deployed at the outskirts of the fort. The guarding force was commanded by the paternal uncle of the Gajapati himself, Tirumala Routaraya. A strong contingent of Vijayanagar forces numbering 34,000 infantry and 800 war elephants marched through Gutti and Gondikotta laid a seize on the fort in the year 1512. A brave defensive hold out and consistent fight across the outer wall of the fort continued for 18 months without any help reaching to the combatants from Odisha. Portuguese traveler Fernao Nunes accompanying the Vijayanagar ruler writes that as the generals of Krishnadeva Raya failed to capture the fort, he himself took the charge. Frenao also mentions that there was a severe fight to tooth and nail put up by the forces from both the sides and the Odia forces were fighting with a strong determination to defend their position until their last breath. To secure an effective position for attacking the stubborn inmates inside the fort, Vijayanagar forces had to cut the rocky boulders and build paths through the surrounding hills. Since no help reached to the Odia forces, they had to surrender finally in the year 1514. A Balagopala idol of lord Sri Krishna was carried away by the Vijayanagar forces as victory trophy from the fort.

Seizure of Kondavidu and captivity of the royal family members (1515 A.D) 
Krishnadeva's forces marched on the smaller forts surrounding the Kondaveedu Fort which formed a strong defensive perimeter of the main fort at Kondavidu. The forces of Vijayanagar were held up for six months due to the resistance of the defending bands and garrisons of Odia forces in the smaller forts like Addanki, Nagarjunakonda, Bellamkonada, Vinukonda, Ketavaram and Kindukuru. Prataparudra Deva reached Kondavidu with a strong army comprising 1300 war elephants and 20,000 cavalry compelling the enemy to retreat for a while. When the Gajapati moved out for Kondapalli, the seize of Kondavidu was again attempted. Some of the Odia officers were bribed and joined the Vijayanagar camp while the crown prince Virabhadra held up the fort for three months. A literary work of the Vijayanagar emperor himself called as Amuktamalyada mentions that the Odia soldiers inside the fort often died without enduring a single wound due to starvation. The Vijayanagar forces had to erect square wooden sheds around the fort and demolished the rampart walls for occupying the tower of the fort. The inmates surrendered the fort in and Virabhadra was taken as captive along with his son Narahari Patra other officers. The Boya chiefs of the Eighteen Kampanas together with 3,00,000 infantry of the Vijayanagar's army devastated and plundered the country dependent on Kondavidu, Kondapalli, Bellamkonda, Vinukonda, Nagarjuna Konda and other forts.

Loss of Kondapalli Fort, the Gajapati administrative center of the Southern Territories 
During the invasion of Vijayanagar, the Qutb Shahi forces of Golconda were allied with Prataparudra Deva as they had the same enemy. After a brief fighting for two months at the Kondapalli Fort by the combined Odia and Qutb Shahi forces, it fell to Vijayanagar forces. The commander of the fort Sirishchandra Mohapatra and the queen of Prataparudra Deva were captured at the fort along with other Odia and Muslims from Golconda state by the Vijayanagar forces and taken as prisoners. After the fall of Kondapalli, the Odia controlled smaller forts in Telegana region like Khamammettu, Anantagiri, Kanakgiri, Nalagonda, Udrakonda, Urlagonda, etc. were taken over by the Vijayanagar forces.

Resistance by Citaph Khan at Potnuru Simhadri and Rajamahendri 
Krishnadevaraya marched to Simhadri region from Rajmahendri but a Muslim general from Warangal serving the Gajapati and possibly a local ruler named as Citaph Khan alias Sitapati lead a large army of 60,000 archers and obstructed the Vijayanagar forces for a long time. The force held the positions tormenting the advancing soldiers of Krishnadevaraya until they finally managed to attack the rear with great difficulty. On the advise of Timmarusu and the increasing ferocity of the Odia forces, he halted his forces at Simhadri where he made some donations at the famous Varahalakshmi Narasimha temple and commissioned the building of the outer walls of the temple. Vijayanagar spies had reported the intact and unique fighting capacities of the Odia forces which they had witnessed at Cuttack.

Honor suicide of Crown Prince Virabhadra 
The captive crown prince Virabhadra who was considered to be a very fine swordsman of his time died a sad death in Vijayanagar when he was forced for showing up his skills in a duel with a commoner for verification by the Krishnadeva himself. Since he belonged to a royal blood line, this demand for a show off with a commoner made him feel dishonored and then he took his own life with the sword he was holding at the time.

Matrimonial alliance and agreement with Vijayanagar 

Disheartened by the death of his son in enemy captivity and his other family members taken as prisoners by Vijayanagar along with his queen, Prataparudra decided to enter into treaty with Krishnadevaraya. As per the treaty, the territories north of the river Krishna were returned to Odisha along with all the family members taken as prisoners in the war. In return Prataparudra had to marry of his daughter Jaganmohini also known as Tukla, Bhadra and Annapurna Devi in marriage to Krishnadevaraya. Later she was abandoned by her husband on the ground of suspicion of being a threat to his life. She lived a life of loner at Kumbham in Kurnool district. She wrote a poem called Tukka Panchakam in which she had confessed the negligent and alienating behavior of Krishnadevaraya towards her.

Conflict with Qutb Shai Dynasty of Golconda (1531 A.D) 
The Qutb Shahi ruler of Golconda Quli Qutb Shah invaded southern parts of Odisha and captured many forts along with the regional administrative center of Kondapalli on 20 March 1531. Prataparudra Deva set out with a force of 3,00,000 infantry, 30,000 cavalry and 700 war elephants to confront the invading forces and was successful after rigorous fighting with the Muslim forces but also lost many large portions of his territory in the south. He built the temple of Mangalagiri on the bank of river Krishna to commemorate his victory over Quli. After the death of Prataparudra Deva in 1540 A.D, Quli captured Rajamahendri as the central administration of Odisha had collapsed and two successors of Prataparudra were murdered by the traitor Govinda Vidyadhar.

Spiritual life and association with Sri Chaitanya 

Gajapati Prataparudra Deva is often held responsible for losing the military status of Odisha due to his spiritual adherence, over involvement and indulgence with Sri Chaitanya. The doubt of historians is based on the fact that the enemy Bengal Sultan Hussain Shah played a role in the life of Chaitanya. Two leading followers of Chaitanya, Rupa Goswami and Sanatana Goswami were courtiers in the administration of Hussain Shah before accompanying Chaitanya in his travel to Odisha. The governor of the southern territories of the Gajapati Ramananda Ray who was based at Rajamahendri was influenced by Chaitanya's words and left his position to follow him while the conditions in the southern frontiers were critical, enduring the invasion of Vijayanagar. However, Prataparudra was himself a devout Vaishnava before the arrival of Chaitanya and was also the head servitor of lord Jagannath as per the royal traditions of the Gajapatis of Odisha. The descriptions of a spy from Vijayanagar about the Gajapati's personal life gives a proper insight about his spiritual ways of living. As per the account, the Gajapati used to wake up two hours earlier before sunrise and would pay respects two Brhamins before looking at anyone else. He would then take ride on his horse accompanied by the Sixteen Brhamin Patras for twenty to thirty miles before returning. After taking bath he would then indulge in worship of lord Jagannath only after which he eats food followed by recitation of Ramayana. After this he carries on his daily business wearing the official robes.

Despite his wish to meet and have an audience with Chaitnaya, the saint avoided any audience as it was his discipline to avoid meeting women and kings. He was only able to see Chaitanya face to face while performing the Chera Pahara ritual during the Ratha Yatra festival of lord Jagannath following which he humbly bowed down to saints present there. Even in an event, he stopped his general Harichandana from taking any retaliatory action against a devotee of Chaitnaya who had obstructed the view of the king by standing in front him and then slapped the general when he tried to move him away. In his first meeting with the saint after a long wait and as planned by his disciples, he began reciting a verse from ‘Gopi Gita’, mentioned in Shrimad Bhagavatam and won the attention of Chaitanya. He presented the saint with a painting of Krishna so that he can meditate on it. Ramananda Rai records about the kings extreme willingness to hear about devotional sermons from Chaitnya in his work Jagannatha-Vallabha-Natakam. Numerous literary works from the era celebrate the spiritual association of Gajapati Prataparudra Deva with Chaitnya.

Cultural contribution, revival of Sanskrit and Odia literature 
Prataparudra Deva had undertaken many building projects despite his troublesome life filled with battles.

Some building activities undertaken during Prataparudra Deva 
 According to the Madala Panji he built the audience hall of the Jagannath temple at Puri.
 Renovation of the temples of Chandrasekhara on the Kapilasa hill in the Dhenkanal district and of Goddess Biraja in the Jajpur district.
 Construction of Dhavalesvara temple at Mancheswar in Cuttack district.
Sarpeswar temple in Balarampur village near Kakhadi.
 Varaha Temple build by his Rajguru or royal head priest called Kashi Mishra at Jajpur district.
 Jagannath Ballav matha or monastery near Puri Jagannath temple established by Ramananda Rai 
Renovated the temple of Paramahansa Deva near Biribati, Cuttack 
In his Undavaill inscription he is termed as a great learner and master of 64 arts. His Velicherla plates states that he assumed the title of Vidyaniddhi (accomplished learner).

Sanskrit literary works composed during Prataparudra Deva 
 Sarasvativilasam by Lalla Laxmidhar
 Contemporary of Advaita-makaranda by Sarvabhauma
 Bhakti Bhagavata Mahakavyam by Dimdima Jivadeva Acharaya
 Jagannatha Vallabha Natakam by Ramananda Raya
 Chaitanya Charitamrita by Kavikarnapura Paramananda Sena
 Lakshnadarsa, Ohurtacarita, Parijataharana Nataka and Rasamanjari by Divakara, a Grammarian,
Other Sanskrit poets like Markandeya, Ramakrishna Bhatta. Balabhadra Mishra flourished in his era.

Sanskrit works written by the Gajapati Prataparudra Deva himself 
The king himself authored works like
 Sarasvativilasam 
 Kautuka Chintamani 
 Nirnya Samgraha,
 Praudha Pratapa Martand 
 Vachaspativilasa 
 Yogadipika 
 Manva Dharmasastra Dipika 
 Karnavatamsa and
 Saundaryalahari Vyakhya

Odia literary works composed during Prataparudra Deva's rule 
Odia literature attained a higher status during the rule of Prataparudra as it was the famous era of and highly respected immortal Odia literary creations by the Panchsakhas or five divine friends namely Balarama Dasa, Jagannatha Dasa, Ananta Dasa, Achyutananda Dasa and Jasobanta Dasa. The Panchasakhas were basically opposed to caste system and Brahmin patronage by the Odia kings. They were also opposed to Gaudiya Vaisnavism that had arrived in Odisha through Chaitanya and contributed to a separate school of learning called Utkaliya. Some of them had ideological conflict with the royal order but were later accepted and encouraged by the king himself after he realized his mistakes.

By Jagannatha Dasa 

 Odia Bhagvata
 Arthakoili 
 Gajastuti 
 Darubrahma Gita 
 Gundicha Vijay Dutibandha 
 Radhamanjari 
 Chaupadi Manasiksha
 Dhruba Charita 
 Udaya Kahani

By Balarama Dasa 

 Jagamohan or Dandi Ramayana 
 Brahmanda Bhugol 
 Vedantasara Gupta Gita 
 Gita Abakasa
 Bhava Samudra 
 Mriguni Stutte
 Laxhmi Purana

By Achyutananda Dasa 

 Kaivarta Gita
 Harivamsa
 Gopalanka Oqala
 Baran Charita Gita
 Sunya Samhita
 Charikhani or Sabdabrahma Samhita

By Jasobanta Dasa 

 Govinda Chandra Gita
 Premabhakti Brahmagita
 Govinda Chandra Gita
 Chaurashi Ajna
 Rasa
 Shiva Svaraday

By Ananata Dasa 

 Garuda-Keshav Sambad
 Thikabahar
 Agatbhabishya·Malika Arthatareni
 Chumbak Malika
 Bhaktijuktidayak Gita
 Anakar Sabad
 Dibi Dibi Ohola
 Pinda Brahmanda Gita 
 Hetu Uday Bhagava

Other Odia poets like Chaitanya Dasa, Arjuna Dasa, Kanhai Khuntia, Gopala Guru, Madhavi Devi and Madhaba Pattanayaka also flourished during his rule giving new dimensions to the literary achievements of Odia language in that era. Prataparudra Deva made it mandatory for only Jayadeva's Gitagovinda to be sung at while the Odia and Telugu Devadasis (temple dancers) while they performed. Four Vaishnava singers were trained to perform the service of singing Gitagovinda verses. It was during his rule that the Gotipua dance tradition was introduced.

Personality and Historical Consequences 
The rule of Prataparudra Deva was an era when a great social revolution in Odisha was at its zenith due to the Bhakti movement closely contested between Gaudiya and Utkaliya Vaishnavism school of thoughts. Common man was not untouched by the beautiful literature and devotional ballads that appeared before them composed by great devotees. Due to forced rigorous military campaigns and failed state policy, the military status of medieval Odisha declined during Prataparudra's rule and the empire was eventually reduced to only a small strip of land in eastern India covering parts of coastal and central Odisha, Northern Andhra and parts of southern Bengal. The tributary and Garhjat (princedoms), rebellious generals and hinterland domains within the Odishan realm destabilized the central authority of the Gajapatis in Odisha.  As an emperor, Prataparudra Deva utilized his full available military strength to defend the frontiers of his empire but events of internal treachery, ignorant policies against a strategically threat of Muslim Bengal by his father and a possible situation of imbalance of his personal spiritual life with the instant demands from his military command, led to the loss of huge southern territories to his enemies. Prataparudra Deva had 32 sons and many daughters from his multiple wives out of which Padma, Padmalaya, Ila and Mahila are known to be the Maharanis or the main queens. One of his queens called Gauri Devi was the disciple of Jagannatha Dasa from the Panchasakha fold. His successors were murdered by the treacherous Govinda Vidyadhara after his death. The military hegemony and imperial status of Odisha continuing from the past era of Somavanshi and Eastern Gangas was lost after his ruling years ended with his death.

References

History of Odisha
History of India by region
Odisha
15th-century Indian monarchs
People from Odisha
Jagannath
Jagannath Temple Complex